Syntypistis melana is a species of moth of the family Notodontidae first described by Chun-Sheng Wu and Cheng-Lai Fang in 2003. It is found in the Chinese provinces of Guangxi and Guizhou.

The forewings are blackish brown scattered with small greenish scales and the hindwings are pale reddish brown.

Etymology
The name is derived from Greek melas (meaning black) and refers to the dark forewings.

References

External links

Moths described in 2003
Endemic fauna of China
Notodontidae